Trimingham railway station was a station in Trimingham, Norfolk on the Norfolk and Suffolk Joint Railway line between Cromer Beach and North Walsham.
It opened on 3 August 1906.

The station was host to a LNER camping coach in 1938 and 1939.

The station closed along this part of the line closed to passengers on 7 April 1953.

References

External links
 Trimingham station on 1946 O. S. map

Rail
Disused railway stations in Norfolk
Former Norfolk and Suffolk Joint Railway stations
Railway stations in Great Britain opened in 1906
Railway stations in Great Britain closed in 1953